Unorganized West Part Manitoulin District is an unorganized area in Manitoulin District in northeastern Ontario, Canada, encompassing the portion of Manitoulin Island which is not part of an organized municipality. It comprises the geographic townships of Robinson and Dawson.

Separate local services boards provide services in Robinson and Dawson townships.

Communities

The division includes the communities of Burnt Island, Cook's Dock, Fernlee, Meldrum Bay and Silver Water.

Meldrum Bay
Meldrum Bay is located at the western terminus of Highway 540, 72 kilometers west of Gore Bay, in Dawson township. Settled in the 1870s, and named after a town in Scotland, Meldrum Bay developed as a commercial fishing and lumbering centre. Once the village was home to a busy fishing fleet, and Great Lakes steamers tied up at the docks.

From the 1920s the Owen Sound Transportation Companysteamers provided weekly ferry service between Meldrum Bay and Thessalon, on its route between Owen Sound and Sault Ste. Marie, Ontario, however, the 1962 opening of the Trans-Canada Highway, and other road improvements has made this service unprofitable. Now during the summer, the docks are busy again, lined with pleasure craft from around the Great Lakes. This area holds some of the best chinook salmon fishing in all of Canada.

Many residents of the area are employed by Lafarge, whose quarry near Meldrum Bay produces dolomite used in concrete, road construction and metallurgical processing. This Lafarge Canada site is the home of the "largest Canadian marine quarry," with loading docks on the Mississagi Strait.

Silver Water
Silver Water is the largest community in Robinson township, located on Highway 540 approximately 42 kilometers west of Gore Bay. It has a year-round population of approximately 62 families, which almost doubles during the summer months. It is a vibrant rural community, with the majority of the population being retired seniors. The community contains a well equipped community center as well as a popular country-style diner, both of which are well used community gathering sites. Silver Water has an all volunteer fire dept. servicing the Robinson township consisting of 1 pumper and 2 tankers. This helps in keeping the residents homeowners insurance rates down. Silver Water also has a very active membership in the local United Church. The Pop is 169 with an average median age being 65.9 years. (2016 Census data)

Demographics

See also
List of townships in Ontario

References

Manitoulin West
Geography of Manitoulin District